Carrim Ali was a police captain in Pretoria, Gauteng, South Africa, whose murder made national headlines.  On June 18, 2009, his alleged killers won a controversial appeal against their sentence.

Biography
Alli was a teacher at Laudium Secondary School before joining the police, and had also occupied the position of secretary of the Laudium ANC branch, and was a noted anti-drug activist.

References and bibliography

External links 
 Mail & Guardian archive on Alli

South African police officers
People murdered in South Africa